Ulvestad is a surname. Notable people with the surname include:

Dan Peter Ulvestad (born 1989), Norwegian footballer
Fredrik Ulvestad (born 1992), Norwegian footballer
Martin Ulvestad (1865–1942), Norwegian-born American historian
Pål Erik Ulvestad (born 1990), Norwegian footballer
Rune Ulvestad (born  1957), Norwegian football coach and former player
Siri Ulvestad (born 1988), Norwegian orienteering competitor and cross-country skier